A Twist in the Tale or Twist in the Tale may refer to:

TV
 A Twist in the Tale, a New Zealand TV series starring William Shatner
 Quinn Martin's Tales of the Unexpected, a 1977 American television show known in the United Kingdom as Twist in the Tale

Others
 A Twist in the Tale (book), a collection of short stories by Jeffrey Archer
 "A Twist in the Tale", a song by Deep Purple from The Battle Rages On